Nitzavim, Nitsavim, Nitzabim, Netzavim, Nisavim, or Nesabim ( — Hebrew for "ones standing," the second word, and the first distinctive word, in the parashah) is the 51st weekly Torah portion (parashah) in the annual Jewish cycle of Torah reading and the eighth in the Book of Deuteronomy. It comprises  (Deuteronomy 29:10 onwards in some versions of the Hebrew Bible). In the parashah, Moses told the Israelites that all the people stood before God to enter into the covenant, violation of which would bring on curses, but if they returned to God and heeded God's commandments, then God would take them back in love and bring them together again from the ends of the world. Moses taught that this Instruction was not beyond reach, and Moses put before the Israelites life and death, blessing and curse, and exhorted them to choose life by loving God and heeding the commandments.

The parashah is made up of 2,123 Hebrew letters, 553 Hebrew words, 40 verses, and 72 lines in a Torah Scroll. Jews generally read it in September or, rarely, late August or early October, on the Sabbath immediately before Rosh Hashanah. The lunisolar Hebrew calendar contains 50 weeks in common years, and 54 or 55 weeks in leap years. In some years (for example, 2021, 2022, and 2025), Parashat Nitzavim is read separately. In other years (for example, 2020, 2023, 2024, 2026, and 2027), Parashat Nitzavim is combined with the next parashah, Vayelech, to help achieve the number of weekly readings needed. The two Torah portions are combined except when two Sabbaths fall between Rosh Hashanah and Sukkot and neither Sabbath coincides with a Holy Day.

Readings
In the Masoretic Text of the Tanakh (Hebrew Bible), Parashat Nitzavim is a single "open portion" (petuchah) (roughly equivalent to a paragraph, often abbreviated with the Hebrew letter , peh) and thus can be considered a single unit. Parashat Nitzavim has several further subdivisions, called "closed portion" (setumah) divisions (abbreviated with the Hebrew letter , samekh). The first closed portion (setumah) spans the first three readings. The second closed portion spans the fourth and fifth readings. The third closed portion is coincident with the sixth reading.

First reading — Deuteronomy 29:9–11
In the first reading (aliyah), Moses told the Israelites that all the people stood that day before God to enter into the covenant. The first reading (aliyah) ends here.

Second reading — Deuteronomy 29:12–14
In the second reading (aliyah), Moses made the covenant both with those who were standing there that day and with those who were not there that day. The second reading (aliyah) ends here.

Third reading — Deuteronomy 29:15–28
In the third reading (aliyah), Moses reminded the Israelites that they had dwelt in the land of Egypt and had passed through various other nations and had seen the detestable idols of wood, stone, silver, and gold that those other nations kept. Moses speculated that perchance there were among the Israelites some whose hearts were even then turning away from God to go worship the gods of those nations, who might think themselves immune, thinking that they would be safe though they followed their own willful hearts. But God would never forgive them; rather God's anger would rage against them until every curse recorded in the Torah would come down upon them and God had blotted out their names. And later generations and other nations would ask why God had done that to those people, and they would be told that it was because they forsook the covenant that God made with them and turned to other gods. So God grew incensed at that land and brought upon it all the curses recorded in the Torah, uprooted them from their soil in anger, and cast them into another land, as would still be the case. Concealed acts concerned God; but with overt acts, it was for the Israelites to apply all the provisions of the Torah. The third reading (aliyah) and a closed portion (setumah) end here with the end of chapter .

Fourth reading — Deuteronomy 30:1–6
In the fourth reading (aliyah), Moses foretold that, after all these curses had befallen them, if they took them to heart in their exile, and they returned to God, and they heeded God's commandments with all their hearts and souls, then God would restore their fortunes, take them back in love, and bring them together again from the ends of the world to the land that their fathers possessed, and God would make them more prosperous and numerous. Then God would open their hearts to love God with all their hearts and souls, in order that they might live. The fourth reading (aliyah) ends here.

Fifth reading — Deuteronomy 30:7–10
In the fifth reading (aliyah), Moses foretold that God would then inflict all those curses on the enemies who persecuted the Israelites, and would bless the Israelites with abounding prosperity, fertility, and productivity. For God would again delight in their wellbeing, as God had in that of their fathers, since they would be heeding God and keeping the commandments once they had returned to God with all their hearts and souls. The fifth reading (aliyah) and a closed portion (setumah) end here.

Sixth reading — Deuteronomy 30:11–14
In the sixth reading (aliyah), Moses said that surely, this Instruction that he enjoined upon them was not too baffling, beyond reach, in the heavens, or beyond the sea; rather it was very close to them, in their mouths and hearts. The sixth reading (aliyah) and a closed portion (setumah) end here.

Seventh reading — Deuteronomy 30:15–20
In the seventh reading (aliyah), which is also the concluding maftir reading, Moses said that he set before them the choice between life and prosperity on the one hand and death and adversity on the other. Moses commanded them to love God, to walk in God's ways, and to keep God's commandments, that they might thrive and increase, and that God might bless them in the land. But if their hearts turned away and they gave no heed, and were lured into the worship of other gods, Moses warned that they would certainly perish and not long endure in the land. Moses called heaven and earth to witness that he had put before the Israelites a choice between life and death, blessing and curse. He exhorted them to choose life by loving God, heeding the commandments, and holding fast to God, so that they might have life and long endure on the land that God swore to their ancestors, Abraham, Isaac, and Jacob. The seventh reading (aliyah), an open portion (petuchah), and the parashah end here.

Readings for Parashiot Nitzavim-Vayelech
When Jews read Parashat Nitzavim together with Parashat Vayelech, they divide readings according to the following schedule:

Readings according to the triennial cycle
In years when Jews read the parashah separately, Jews who read the Torah according to the triennial cycle of Torah reading read the entire parashah according to the schedule of first through seventh readings in the text above. When Jews read Parashat Nitzavim together with Parashat Vayelech, Jews who read the Torah according to the triennial cycle can read the parashah according to the following schedule.

Key words
Words used frequently in the parashah include: God, gods (27 times); day, days (16 times); land (14 times); and heart (10 times).

In inner-biblical interpretation
The parashah has parallels or is discussed in these Biblical sources:

Deuteronomy chapter 29
In , Moses cast the net broadly to include in the covenant all in the Israelite camp, including "your stranger" and those in the servant classes of "the hewer of your wood to the drawer of your water." In , the Gibeonites tricked Joshua into believing that they were not among the local inhabitants whom God had instructed the Israelites to eliminate. Even so, 2 Samuel  reports that later in the time of David, "the Gibeonites were not of the children of Israel, but of the remnant of the Amorites."

Deuteronomy chapter 30

Similarly, Psalm  reports that God "summoned the heavens above, and the earth, for the trial of His people," saying "Bring in My devotees, who made a covenant with Me over sacrifice!"  continues: "Then the heavens proclaimed His righteousness, for He is a God who judges."

In early nonrabbinic interpretation
The parashah has parallels or is discussed in these early nonrabbinic sources:

Deuteronomy chapter 29
Another Dead Sea Scroll, The Rule of the Congregation (1QSa), described how the Qumran sectarians planned to reenact that covenant renewal ceremony in the End of Days.

In classical rabbinic interpretation
The parashah is discussed in these rabbinic sources from the era of the Mishnah and the Talmud:

Deuteronomy chapter 29
A Midrash taught that the words, "You are standing this day all of you before the Lord your God," in  should have been placed at the beginning of the Book of Deuteronomy, only the Torah does not follow chronological order.

A Midrash cited  as one of several places where Scripture speaks of the people of Israel as it does of angels.  For Scripture speaks of both angels and the people of Israel as standing.  In reference to angels,  says, "Above Him stood the seraphim," while concerning Israel,  says, "You are standing this day." Similarly,  reports that the angels daily proclaim a three-part praise of God, saying, "Holy, holy, holy," and the people of Israel correspondingly daily say in three parts in the Amidah prayer, "The God of Abraham, the God of Isaac, and the God of Jacob."  calls the angels "fire," referring to, "The flaming fire Your ministers," and  also calls Israel "fire," saying, "And the house of Jacob shall be a fire." The Midrash told how angels renew themselves each day, praise the Lord, and then return to the river of fire from which they emerged, and the Lord renews them and restores them to their former condition; for  reports, "They are new every morning." So also Israel is sunk in iniquity on account of the evil impulse (yetzer hara), but they do penitence, and God each year (on Yom Kippur) pardons them and renews their heart to fear God; for  says, "A new heart also will I give you." Hence God compared Israel to angels in Song of Songs , which calls Israel: "Terrible as an army with banners."

Rabbi Berekiah interpreted , "I am the man (gever) who has seen affliction by the rod of His wrath," to mean that God strengthened the writer (representing the people of God) to withstand all afflictions (interpreting , gever, "man," to mean , gibor, "strong man").

One taught that the verse compared Israel to a wedge used to split a log (as the wedge, Israel, is struck, but the log, the enemy, is split). The other taught that the verse compared Israel to a post on which a target for arrows is placed, at which all shoot but which remains standing. Rabbi Judan taught that the verse meant that God strengthened the writer (representing the people of God) to withstand all afflictions (reading , vayatziveni, to mean "He has made me stand firm").

The school of Rabbi Yannai taught that they could thus serve as agents for the delivery of divorce documents.

In response to a question from Rav Aha son of Rava, Rav Ashi taught that although later converts to Judaism may not have been literally present at Mount Sinai,  indicated that their angelic advocates were present when it said: "Neither with you only do I make this covenant and this oath, but with him who stands here with us this day before the Lord our God, and also with him who is not here with us this day." 

The Tosefta deduced from  that the conditions that the Rabbis deduced from the Torah for administering oaths will also apply to future generations and converts.

Similarly, a Baraita cited  for the proposition that the covenant at Sinai included not only those who were standing by Mount Sinai, but also generations to come and converts who later became Jews. And the Baraita taught that they were also bound by commandments promulgated later, such as reading the Scroll of Esther on Purim, because  reports, "They confirmed and accepted," indicating that the Jewish people confirmed that they had long ago accepted such commandments at Mount Sinai.

A Midrash interpreted  to teach that God made a covenant not only with those at Sinai but also with generations to come. Rabbi Abbahu taught in the name of Rabbi Samuel bar Nachmani that  says, "with him who stands here with us this day . . . and also with him who is not here with us this day," because souls were there even though their bodies were not yet created.

Similarly, Rabbi Isaac read  to teach that the prophets received from the Revelation at Sinai all the messages that they were to prophesy to subsequent generations. For  does not say, "who are not here standing with us this day," but just "who are not with us this day." Rabbi Isaac taught that  thus refers to the souls that were to be created thereafter; because these souls did not yet have any substance in them, they could not yet be "standing" at Sinai. But although these souls did not yet exist, they still received their share of the Torah that day. Similarly, Rabbi Isaac concluded that all the Sages who arose in every generation thereafter received their wisdom from the Revelation at Sinai, for  says, "These words the Lord spoke to all your assembly . . . with a great voice, and it went on no more", implying that God's Revelation went on no more thereafter.

Reading , the Pirke De-Rabbi Eliezer told that at the Revelation at Sinai, when the voice of the first commandment went forth, the heavens and earth quaked, the waters and rivers fled, the mountains and hills moved, all the trees fell prostrate, and the dead who were in Sheol revived and stood on their feet until the end of all the generations. For  says, "with him who stands here with us this day." And the Pirke De-Rabbi Eliezer read  to teach that those who in the future would be created, until the end of all the generations, also stood there with those at Mount Sinai, as  says, "And also with him who is not here with us this day."

The Tosefta deduced from  that Moses adjured the Israelites on the plains of Moab not according to what was in their hearts, but according to what was in his heart.

In , the heart cavils. A Midrash catalogued the wide range of additional capabilities of the heart reported in the Hebrew Bible. The heart speaks, sees, hears, walks, falls, stands, rejoices, cries, is comforted, is troubled, becomes hardened, grows faint, grieves, fears, can be broken, becomes proud, rebels, invents, overflows, devises, desires, goes astray, lusts, is refreshed, can be stolen, is humbled, is enticed, errs, trembles, is awakened, loves, hates, envies, is searched, is rent, meditates, is like a fire, is like a stone, turns in repentance, becomes hot, dies, melts, takes in words, is susceptible to fear, gives thanks, covets, becomes hard, makes merry, acts deceitfully, speaks from out of itself, loves bribes, writes words, plans, receives commandments, acts with pride, makes arrangements, and aggrandizes itself.

Rav Judah taught in Rav's name that the words, "that he bless himself in his heart, saying: 'I shall have peace, though I walk in the stubbornness of my heart — that the watered be swept away with the dry'; the Lord will not be willing to pardon him," in  apply to one who marries his daughter to an old man, or takes a mature wife for his infant son, or returns a lost article to an idolater.

Rabbi Haninah (or some say Rabbi Joshua ben Levi) deduced from the words "the whole land thereof is brimstone, and salt" in  that all the land of Israel was burned, and thus even wicked people buried in the land of Israel before that time will merit to be resurrected, because the burning of the land will have executed on them the punishment that justice demanded. A Baraita taught in the name of Rabbi Judah that the land of Israel burned for seven years.

But Rabbi Eliezer interpreted the allusion to "day" in  differently, teaching that just as the day darkens and then becomes light again, so even though it went dark for the Ten Tribes, it will become light for them again.

Rabbi Judah said that the dots teach that God would not punish the Israelite community as a whole for transgressions committed in secret until the Israelites had crossed the Jordan River. Rabbi Nehemiah questioned, however, whether God ever punished the Israelite community for transgressions committed in secret, noting that  said, "The secret things belong to the Lord our God . . . forever." Rabbi Nehemiah taught that God did not punish the Israelite community for secret transgressions at any time, and God did not punish the Israelite community as a whole for open transgressions until they had crossed the Jordan.

Similarly, in the Jerusalem Talmud, Rabbi Simeon ben Lakish (Resh Lakish) taught that when the Israelites were crossing the Jordan River, they took upon themselves responsibility for each other's hidden sins as well as revealed sins.  Joshua told them that if they did not accept responsibility for hidden things, the waters of the Jordan would descend and drown them.  Rabbi Simon bar Zabeda agreed, saying that we know that this is true, because Achan sinned in secret after the Israelites crossed the Jordan, and the majority of the Sanhedrin fell at the battle of Ai on account of Achan's sin.  Rabbi Levi, however, taught that at Yavneh, the strap was untied and people were no longer subject to punishment for the private sins of individuals.  A Heavenly voice declared that the Israelites no longer needed to get involved in hidden sins or to inquire about them.

Rabbi (Judah the Patriarch) taught that when all Israel stood before Mount Sinai to receive the Torah, they decided unanimously to accept the reign of God joyfully. Furthermore, they pledged themselves responsible for one another. God was willing to make a covenant with the Israelites not only concerning overt acts that God revealed to Israel, but also concerning God's secret acts, reading  to say, "The secret things belong to the Lord our God and the things that are revealed." But the Israelites told God that they were ready to make a covenant with God with regard to overt acts, but not with regard to secret acts, lest one Israelite commit a sin secretly and the entire community be held responsible for it.

One explanation: God told the Israelites that they had performed the precepts that had been revealed, and God, on God's part, would make known to them the things that were secret. Another explanation: Ezra (whom some consider the author of these diacritical points, although others regard them as having come from Sinai) reasoned that if Elijah came and asked Ezra why he had written these words, Ezra could answer that he had already placed points over them. And if Elijah told Ezra that he had done well in writing them, then Ezra would erase the points over them. (If Elijah said that the words should not have been written, Ezra could answer that he had dotted them so that people could understand that they were to be disregarded. If Elijah approved of the words, then Ezra could erase the dots.)

The Avot of Rabbi Natan enumerated ten Torah passages marked with dots.

Deuteronomy chapter 30
A Midrash interpreted  to teach that if the Israelites repented while they were in exile, then God would gather them back together, as  says, "And it shall come to pass, when all these things are come upon you, the blessing and the curse . . . and [you] shall return . . . and hearken to His voice . . . the Lord your God will bring you into the land . . . and the Lord your God will circumcise your heart."

Rabbi Simon ben Yohai deduced from the words "the Lord your God will return [with] your captivity" in  that the Shechinah went with the Israelites to every place to which they were exiled, and will be with them when they are redeemed in the future. By way of explanation, the Baraita noted that  did not say "and [God] shall bring back" but "and [God] shall return," teaching that God will return with the Israelites from their places of exile. Rabbi Simon concluded that  thus showed how beloved the Children of Israel are in God's sight.

Rabbi Jose bar Haninah deduced from  that when the Jews arrived back in the land of Israel in the time of Ezra, they once again became obligated to obey commandments like tithes (ma'asrot). Rabbi Jose bar Haninah reasoned that the words, "And the Lord your God will bring you into the land that your fathers possessed, and you shall possess it," in  showed that the Jews' possession of the land in the time of Ezra was comparable to their possession of it in the time of Joshua. And thus, just as Jews in the time of Joshua were obliged to tithe, so Jews in the time of Ezra were obliged to tithe.

A Midrash taught that fools enter the synagogue, and seeing people occupying themselves with the law, ask how a person learns the law. They answer that first a person reads from children's materials, then from the Torah, then from the Prophets (Nevi'im), and then from the Writings (Ketuvim). Then the person learns the Talmud, then the law (halachah), and then the Midrash (haggadot). Hearing this, fools ask themselves when they can learn all that, and turn to leave. Rabbi Jannai compared this to a loaf suspended in the air. The fool exclaims that no one can bring it down. But the wise person says that someone put it there and takes a ladder or stick and brings it down. So fools complain that they are unable to read all the law. But wise people learn a chapter every day until they read all the law.

A Midrash told that if people complained that the Torah disadvantaged them, they should know that God actually gave them the Torah to benefit then. Then  continues, "And kept close from the flying beings of the air," and this refers to the angels, as  says, "Then flew to me one of the Seraphim." God told the Israelites that the law was too abstruse for the ministering angels, but not for the Israelites, as  says, "this commandment that I command you this day, it is not too hard for you."

Rav Judah taught in the name of Rav that because, as  reports, the Torah is not in Heaven, God was not able to answer Joshua's questions about the law. Rav Judah reported in the name of Rav that when Moses was dying, he invited Joshua to ask him about any doubts that Joshua might have. Joshua replied by asking Moses whether Joshua had ever left Moses for an hour and gone elsewhere. But his servant Joshua the son of Nun departed not out of the Tabernacle." Joshua's words wounded Moses, and immediately the strength of Moses waned, and Joshua forgot 300 laws, and 700 doubts concerning laws arose in Joshua's mind. The Israelites then arose to kill Joshua (unless he could resolve these doubts). God then told Joshua that it was not possible to tell him the answers (for, as  tells, the Torah is not in Heaven). Instead, God then directed Joshua to occupy the Israelites' attention in war, as  reports.

A Baraita taught that one day, Rabbi Eliezer employed every imaginable argument for the proposition that a particular type of oven was not susceptible to ritual impurity, but the Sages did not accept his arguments. Then Rabbi Eliezer told the Sages, "If the law agrees with me, then let this carob tree prove it," and the carob tree moved 100 cubits (and others say 400 cubits) out of its place. But the Sages said that no proof can be brought from a carob tree. Then Rabbi Eliezer told the Sages, "If the halachah agrees with me, let this stream of water prove it," and the stream of water flowed backwards. But the Sages said that no proof can be brought from a stream of water. Then Rabbi Eliezer told the Sages, "If the halachah agrees with me, let the walls of this house of study prove it," and the walls leaned over as if to fall. But Rabbi Joshua rebuked the walls, telling them not to interfere with scholars engaged in a halachic dispute. In honor of Rabbi Joshua, the walls did not fall, but in honor of Rabbi Eliezer, the walls did not stand upright, either. Then Rabbi Eliezer told the Sages, "If the halachah agrees with me, let Heaven prove it," and a Heavenly Voice cried out: "Why do you dispute with Rabbi Eliezer, for in all matters the halachah agrees with him!" But Rabbi Joshua rose and exclaimed in the words of  "It is not in heaven." Rabbi Jeremiah explained that God had given the Torah at Mount Sinai; Jews pay no attention to Heavenly Voices, for God wrote in  "After the majority must one incline." Later, Rabbi Nathan met Elijah and asked him what God did when Rabbi Joshua rose in opposition to the Heavenly Voice. Elijah replied that God laughed with joy, saying, "My children have defeated Me, My children have defeated Me!"

Rav Hisda taught that one should use mnemonic devices to learn the Torah. And the Gemara taught that this agrees with Abdimi bar Hama bar Dosa, who interpreted  to mean that if it were "in heaven," one would have to go up after it, and if it were "beyond the sea," one would have to go overseas after it. Rather, people can learn the Torah using the tools that they find where they are. Rava (or some say Rabbi Johanan) interpreted "it is not in heaven" to mean that the Torah is not to be found among those who believe that their insight towers as high as the heavens. And Rava interpreted "neither is it beyond the sea" to mean that it is not to be found among those whose self-esteem expands as the sea. Rabbi Johanan (or some say Rava) interpreted "it is not in heaven" to mean that the Torah is not to be found among the arrogant. And Rabbi Johanan interpreted "neither is it beyond the sea" to mean that it is not to be found among traveling merchants and business people.

When people countered that Samuel himself was an astrologer and also a great Torah scholar, he replied that he engaged in astrology only when he was free from studying the Torah — when he was in the bath.

Reading , "For this commandment that I command you this day . . . is very near to you, in your mouth, and in your heart," a Midrash related the commandments to the human body. The Midrash taught that  bears out , "For they are life to those who find them, and health to all their flesh." Rabbi Hiyya taught that the law is a salve for the eye, an emollient for a wound, and a root-drink for the bowels. The law is a salve for the eye, as  says, "The commandment of the Lord is pure, enlightening the eyes." The law is an emollient for a wound, as  says, "It shall be health to your navel." And the law is a root-drink for the bowels, as  continues, "And marrow to your bones." The Midrash related that a disciple of Rabbi Eliezer ben Jacob used to run through all of his study in a single hour, and when once when he fell ill, he forgot all that he had learned, because he did not speak the words out loud. When, however, Rabbi Eliezer ben Jacob prayed for him, all his learning came back to him.

Reading , "For this commandment that I command you this day . . . is very near to you, in your mouth, and in your heart," a Midrash interpreted "heart" and "mouth" to symbolize the beginning and end of fulfilling a precept and thus read  as an exhortation to complete a good deed once started. Thus Rabbi Hiyya bar Abba taught that if one begins a precept and does not complete it, the result will be that he will bury his wife and children. The Midrash cited as support for this proposition the experience of Judah, who began a precept and did not complete it. And had Judah called for Joseph's brothers to restore Joseph to their father, they would have listened to him then, as well. Thus because Judah began a precept (the good deed toward Joseph) and did not complete it, he buried his wife and two sons, as  reports, "Shua's daughter, the wife of Judah, died," and  further reports, "Er and Onan died in the land of Canaan." The Midrash illustrated this by citing how Moses began a precept by taking the bones of Joseph with him, as  reports, "And Moses took the bones of Joseph with him." But because Moses never brought Joseph's bones into the Land of Israel, the precept is attributed to the Israelites, who buried them, as  reports, "And the bones of Joseph, which the children of Israel brought up out of Egypt, they buried in Shechem."  does not say, "Which Moses brought up out of Egypt," but "Which the children of Israel brought up out of Egypt." And the Midrash explained that the reason that they buried Joseph's bones in Shechem could be compared to a case in which some thieves stole a cask of wine, and when the owner discovered them, the owner told them that after they had consumed the wine, they needed to return the cask to its proper place. So when the brothers sold Joseph, it was from Shechem that they sold him, as  reports, "And Israel said to Joseph: 'Do not your brothers feed the flock in Shechem?'" God told the brothers that since they had sold Joseph from Shechem, they needed to return Joseph's bones to Shechem.

Rabbi Samuel taught that it is as if there were a king's daughter who was not acquainted with any man, and the king had a friend who could visit him at any time, and the princess waited on the friend. The king told the friend that this indicated how much the king loved him, for no one was acquainted with his daughter, yet she waited upon the friend. Similarly, God told Israel that it indicated how beloved Israel was to God, for no being in God's palace was acquainted with the Torah, yet God entrusted it to Israel. As  says, "Seeing it is hid from the eyes of all living," but as for the Children of Israel (as  says), "It is not too hard for you . . . but the word is very near to you."

He explained that the words of the Torah are "pleasant" when one keeps them within oneself, and one does that when the words are "established altogether upon your lips." Rabbi Isaac said that this may be derived from the words of  "But the word is very near to you, in your mouth, and in your heart, that you may do it," for "it is very near to you" when it is "in your mouth and in your heart" to do it. Thus, reading the Torah aloud helps one to keep its precepts in one's heart, and thus to carry them out.

The Pirke De-Rabbi Eliezer told that Rabbi Eliezer heard God say the words of  "See, I have set before you this day life and good, and death and evil." God said that God had given Israel these two ways, one good, the other evil. The good one is of life, the evil one of death. The good way has two byways, one of righteousness and the other of love, and Elijah stands exactly between the two. Samuel the prophet, placed between the two byways, asked on which of the two byways to go. If he went on the way of righteousness, then the path of love would be better; if he went on the way of love, the way of righteousness would be better. But Samuel said that he would not give up either of them. God told Samuel that because the prophet had placed himself between the two good byways, God would give him three good gifts. Thus, everyone who does righteousness and shows the service of love inherits the three gifts of life, righteousness, and glory (as  promises). Leading to the way of evil are four doors, and at each door stand seven angels — four merciful angels outside, and three cruel angels inside. When a person comes to enter a door, the merciful angels urge the person not to enter but to repent. If the person heeds them and repents, it is well, but if not, they tell the person not to enter the next door. Even as the person is about to enter the fourth door, the merciful angels say that every day God calls on people to return.

Thus the Sifre read , "All who will be called by the name of the Lord shall be delivered," to teach that just as  calls God "merciful and gracious," we, too, should be merciful and gracious. And just as  says, "The Lord is righteous," we, too, should be righteous.

The Gemara taught that the words "if your heart turns away . . . you will not hear" in  can describe Torah study. If one listens to the old, and reviews what one has already learned, then one will perceive new understanding. But if one turns away and does not review what one has learned, then one may not perceive the opportunity for new learning.

Rabbi Haggai taught that not only had God in  set two paths before the Israelites, "a blessing and a curse," but God did not administer justice to them according to the strict letter of the law, but allowed them mercy so that they might (in the words of ) "choose life."

The Sifre explained that  explicitly says, "I set before you this day a blessing and a curse: the blessing, if you obey the commandments . . . and the curse, if you shall not obey the commandments," because otherwise the Israelites might read , "I have set before you life and death, the blessing and the curse," and think that since God set before them both paths, they could go whichever way they chose. Thus,  directs explicitly: "choose life."

Rabbi Ishmael deduced from the words "choose life" in  that one can learn a trade to earn a livelihood, notwithstanding the admonition of  that "you shall contemplate [the Torah] day and night."

The Rabbis taught that once the Roman government forbade Jews to study the Torah. Pappus ben Judah found Rabbi Akiva publicly gathering people to study Torah and asked Akiva whether he did not fear the government. Akiva replied with a parable: A fox was once walking alongside of a river, and he saw fish swimming from one place to another. The fox asked the fish from what they fled. The fish replied that they fled from the nets cast by men. The fox invited the fish to come up onto the dry land, so that they could live together as the fox's ancestors had lived with the fish's ancestors. The fish replied that for an animal described as the cleverest of animals, the fox was rather foolish. For if the fish were afraid in the element in which they live, how much more would they fear in the element in which they would die. Akiva said that it was the same with Jews. If such was the Jews' condition when they sat and studied Torah, of which  says, "that is your life and the length of your days," how much worse off would Jews be if they neglected the Torah!

A Baraita was taught in the Academy of Eliyahu: A certain scholar diligently studied Bible and Mishnah, and greatly served scholars, but nonetheless died young. His wife carried his tefillin to the synagogues and schoolhouses and asked if  says, "for that is your life, and the length of your days," why her husband nonetheless died young. No one could answer her. On one occasion, Eliyahu asked her how he was to her during her days of white garments — the seven days after her menstrual period — and she reported that they ate, drank, and slept together without clothing. Eliyahu explained that God must have slain him because he did not sufficiently respect the separation that  requires.

In medieval Jewish interpretation
The parashah is discussed in these medieval Jewish sources:

Deuteronomy chapter 29
Baḥya ibn Paquda read , "The secret things belong to the Lord, our God," to teach that God knows equally what people reveal and what they conceal, and God will repay people for all that God's omniscience observes in us, even if it remains hidden from other people.

For each specific case has its own particular reason, known only to God.

Deuteronomy chapter 30
Baḥya ibn Paquda read  to reduce all religious service to the service of the heart and tongue.

Baḥya ibn Paquda cited  for the proposition that a tainted motive renders even numerous good deeds unacceptable.

But other verses imply that all is determined by God. Baḥya taught that the view closest to the way of salvation accepts both human free will and God's determination. Thus, Baḥya counselled that one should act as if actions are left to a human beings' free will and will be rewarded or punished, and that we should strive to do all that will please God. At the same time, one ought to trust in God with the trust of one fully convinced that all things happen by God's decree and that God has a conclusive claim on us, while we have no claim on God.

In his Mishneh Torah, Maimonides hinged his discussion of free will on  says, "Behold, I have set before you today life and good, death and evil." Maimonides taught that God grants free will to all people. One can choose to turn to good or evil.

Maimonides taught that people should not entertain the foolish thesis that at the time of their creation, God decrees whether they will be righteous or wicked (what some call "predestination"). Rather, each person is fit to be righteous or wicked. Jeremiah implied this in  "From the mouth of the Most High, neither evil nor good come forth." Accordingly, sinners, themselves, cause their own loss. It is thus proper for people to mourn for their sins and for the evil consequences that they have brought upon their own souls. Jeremiah continues that since free choice is in our hands and our own decision prompts us to commit wrongs, it is proper for us to repent and abandon our wickedness, for the choice is in our hands.

Maimonides taught that this principle is a pillar on which rests the Torah and the commandments, as  says, "Behold, I have set before you today life and good, death and evil," and  says, "Behold, I have set before you today the blessing and the curse," implying that the choice is in our hands.

Maimonides argued that the idea that God decrees that an individual is righteous or wicked (as imagined by astrology) is inconsistent with God's command through the prophets to "do this" or "not do this." For according to this mistaken conception, from the beginning of humanity's creation, their nature would draw them to a particular quality and they could not depart from it. Maimonides saw such a view as inconsistent with the entire Torah, with the justice of retribution for the wicked or reward for the righteous, and with the idea that the world's Judge acts justly.

Maimonides taught that even so, nothing happens in the world without God's permission and desire, as  says, "Whatever God wishes, He has done in the heavens and in the earth." Maimonides said that everything happens in accord with God's will, and, nevertheless, we are responsible for our deeds. Explaining how this apparent contradiction is resolved, Maimonides said that just as God desired that fire rises upward and water descends downward, so too, God desired that people have free choice and be responsible for their deeds, without being pulled or forced. Rather, people, on their own initiative, with the knowledge that God granted them, do anything that people are able to do. Therefore, people are judged according to their deeds. If they do good, they are treated with beneficence. If they do bad, they are treated harshly. This is implied by the prophets.

Maimonides acknowledged that one might ask: Since God knows everything that will occur before it comes to pass, does God not know whether a person will be righteous or wicked? And if God knows that a person will be righteous, it would appear impossible for that person not to be righteous. However, if one would say that despite God's knowledge that the person would be righteous it is possible for the person to be wicked, then God's knowledge would be incomplete. Maimonides taught that just as it is beyond human potential to comprehend God's essential nature, as  says, "No man will perceive Me and live," so, too, it is beyond human potential to comprehend God's knowledge. This was what Isaiah intended when  says, "For My thoughts are not your thoughts, nor your ways, My ways." Accordingly, we do not have the potential to conceive how God knows all the creations and their deeds. But Maimonides said that it is without doubt that people's actions are in their own hands and God does not decree them. Consequently, the prophets taught that people are judged according to their deeds.

Citing , Baḥya ibn Paquda taught that love for God is a leading example of a duty of the heart.

In modern interpretation
The parashah is discussed in these modern sources:

Deuteronomy chapter 29

Noting numerous connotations of the word "Torah" in the Pentateuch, Professor Ephraim Speiser of the University of Pennsylvania in the mid 20th century wrote that the word is based on a verbal stem signifying "to teach, guide," and the like.

Deuteronomy chapter 30
The Mishnah Berurah cited this as Scriptural support for the practice of rising early to say prayers for forgiveness (Selichot) from the first day of the month of Elul until Yom Kippur.

Alter taught that the point is that good, which may lead to prosperity, is associated with life, just as evil, which may lead to adversity, is associated with death. Alter wrote that the Deuteronomic assumptions about historical causation may seem problematic or even untenable, but the powerful notion of the urgency of moral choice continues to resonate.

Professor James Kugel of Bar Ilan University wrote that the words of  resounded in the ears of generations of Jews and Christians. Kugel taught that in a sense, all Jewish and Christian devotion — religious services, prayers, the study of Scripture, and dozens of other acts intended to carry out God's will — find at least part of their origin and inspiration in these words.

Commandments
According to Maimonides and the Sefer ha-Chinuch, there are no commandments in the parashah. Nachmanides, reading , suggests that  contains a commandment of repentance (teshuvah).

In the liturgy

Haftarah

The haftarah is the seventh and concluding installment in the cycle of seven haftarot of consolation after Tisha B'Av, leading up to Rosh Hashanah.

Summary
The prophet rejoiced in God, who had clothed him with salvation, covered him with victory, as a bridegroom dons a priestly diadem, as a bride adorns herself with jewels. For as the earth brings forth vegetation, so God will cause victory and glory to sprout before the nations.

For Zion's sake, the prophet would not hold his peace, until Jerusalem's triumph would burn brightly for the nations to see, and Zion would be called by a new name given by God. Zion would be a crown of beauty in God's hand, and no more would she be called Forsaken or Desolate, but she would be called Delight and Espoused, for God would rejoice over her as a bridegroom over his bride.

The prophet set lookouts on Jerusalem's walls, until God would make Jerusalem a praise in the earth. God has sworn no more to give Israel's corn to her enemies, nor her wine to strangers, but those who harvested shall eat, and those who gathered shall drink, in the courts of God's sanctuary.

The prophet said clear the way, for God proclaimed to Zion that her salvation was coming. And they shall call the Israelites the holy people, and Jerusalem shall be called Sought out, not Forsaken.

The prophet asked Who came in crimson garments from Edom, mighty to save, and why God's apparel was red like one who trod in the wine vat. God said that God had trodden the winepress in anger alone, and trampled in fury, for the day of vengeance was in God's heart, and God's year of redemption had come. God looked and found none to help to uphold God's will, so God trod down the peoples in anger, and poured out their blood.

The prophet spoke of God's mercies and praises, of God's great goodness toward Israel, which God bestowed with compassion. For God said, "Surely, they are My people," and so God was their Savior. In all their affliction God was afflicted, and God's angel saved them; in love and pity God redeemed them, and God bore them and carried them all the days of old.

Connection to the Special Sabbath
Concluding the series of consolation after Tisha B'Av, and leading up to the Days of Awe, the haftarah features God's salvation, redemption, mercies, and compassion.

Notes and references

Further reading
The parashah has parallels or is discussed in these sources:

Biblical
, 27 (hewers of wood and drawers of water).
 (God punishing the wicked);  (fool who "in his heart" imagines escaping God);  (God as life-giver);  (God rooting out evil);  (God as life-giver);  (God's anger);  (God's jealousy as fire);  (God will return);  (God restores);  (God gathers exiles).

Classical rabbinic
Mishnah: Sanhedrin 10:3. Land of Israel, circa 200 CE. In, e.g., The Mishnah: A New Translation. Translated by Jacob Neusner, page 605. New Haven: Yale University Press, 1988. .
Tosefta: Sotah 7:3–5; Avodah Zarah 6:13. Land of Israel, circa 250 CE. In, e.g., The Tosefta: Translated from the Hebrew, with a New Introduction. Translated by Jacob Neusner, volume 1, pages 861–62; volume 2, page 1285. Peabody, Massachusetts: Hendrickson Publishers, 2002. .
Sifre to Deuteronomy 304:1–305:3. Land of Israel, circa 250–350 CE. In, e.g., Sifre to Deuteronomy: An Analytical Translation. Translated by Jacob Neusner, volume 2, pages 289–294. Atlanta: Scholars Press, 1987. .

Jerusalem Talmud: Peah 5b; Kilayim 81a; Sheviit 42b; Beitzah 25a; Taanit 29a; Moed Katan 12a; Ketubot 71a; Nedarim 8b; Sotah 13a, 31b, 51a; Kiddushin 19b, 23a; Avodah Zarah 19b; Horayot 18a. Tiberias, Land of Israel, circa 400 CE. In, e.g., Talmud Yerushalmi. Edited by Chaim Malinowitz, Yisroel Simcha Schorr, and Mordechai Marcus, volumes 3, 5, 6b, 23, 25, 28, 32–33, 36–37, 40, 48–49. Brooklyn: Mesorah Publications, 2006–2020. And in, e.g., The Jerusalem Talmud: A Translation and Commentary. Edited by Jacob Neusner and translated by Jacob Neusner, Tzvee Zahavy, B. Barry Levy, and Edward Goldman. Peabody, Massachusetts: Hendrickson Publishers, 2009. .
Genesis Rabbah 53:10. Land of Israel, 5th century. In, e.g., Midrash Rabbah: Genesis. Translated by Harry Freedman and Maurice Simon, volume 1, page 469. London: Soncino Press, 1939. .
Babylonian Talmud: Berakhot 40a, 55a, 61b; Shabbat 13a, 146a; Eruvin 54a–55a; Pesachim 49b; Yoma 54a; Sukkah 46b; Megillah 29a; Yevamot 79a, 82b; Ketubot 111b; Nedarim 25a, 62a; Gittin 23b; Kiddushin 40a; Bava Metzia 59b; Sanhedrin 43b, 76b, 99b, 110b; Makkot 22b; Shevuot 29a, 39a; Avodah Zarah 51b; Arakhin 32b; Temurah 16a; Niddah 46b. Sasanian Empire, 6th century. In, e.g., Talmud Bavli. Edited by Yisroel Simcha Schorr, Chaim Malinowitz, and Mordechai Marcus, 72 volumes. Brooklyn: Mesorah Pubs., 2006.

Early nonrabbinic
Qur'an 54:17. Arabia, 7th century.

Medieval
Deuteronomy Rabbah 4:3; 8:1–7. Land of Israel, 9th century. In, e.g., Midrash Rabbah: Deuteronomy. Translated by Harry Freedman and Maurice Simon, pages 91, 147–55. London: Soncino Press, 1939. .

Rashi. Commentary. Deuteronomy 29–30. Troyes, France, late 11th century. In, e.g., Rashi. The Torah: With Rashi's Commentary Translated, Annotated, and Elucidated. Translated and annotated by Yisrael Isser Zvi Herczeg, volume 5, pages 303–18. Brooklyn: Mesorah Publications, 1997. .
Rashbam. Commentary on the Torah. Troyes, early 12th century. In, e.g., Rashbam's Commentary on Deuteronomy: An Annotated Translation. Edited and translated by Martin I. Lockshin, pages 165–67. Providence, Rhode Island: Brown Judaic Studies, 2004. .
Judah Halevi. Kuzari. 2:34. Toledo, Spain, 1130–1140. In, e.g., Jehuda Halevi. Kuzari: An Argument for the Faith of Israel. Introduction by Henry Slonimsky, page 108. New York: Schocken, 1964. .
Abraham ibn Ezra. Commentary on the Torah. Mid-12th century. In, e.g., Ibn Ezra's Commentary on the Pentateuch: Deuteronomy (Devarim). Translated and annotated by H. Norman Strickman and Arthur M. Silver, volume 5, pages 212–23. New York: Menorah Publishing Company, 2001. .

Maimonides. Mishneh Torah: Hilchot Yesodei HaTorah (The Laws that Are the Foundations of the Torah), chapter 7, halachah 7; chapter 9, halachah 1. Egypt, circa 1170–1180. In, e.g., Mishneh Torah: Hilchot Yesodei HaTorah: The Laws [which Are] the Foundations of the Torah. Translated by Eliyahu Touger, volume 1, pages 258–62, 270–74. New York: Moznaim Publishing, 1989. .

Hezekiah ben Manoah. Hizkuni. France, circa 1240. In, e.g., Chizkiyahu ben Manoach. Chizkuni: Torah Commentary. Translated and annotated by Eliyahu Munk, volume 4, pages 1192–97. Jerusalem: Ktav Publishers, 2013. .
Nachmanides. Commentary on the Torah. Jerusalem, circa 1270. In, e.g., Ramban (Nachmanides): Commentary on the Torah: Deuteronomy. Translated by Charles B. Chavel, volume 5, pages 331–43. New York: Shilo Publishing House, 1976. .

Zohar volume 1, pages 1b, 23a, 91a, 92a, 108a, 120b, 157a, 168a, 173a, 222b; volume 2, pages 3a, 9a, 17a, 62a, 82a, 83b, 86b, 174b, 188b; volume 3, pages 86a, 159a, 270a. Spain, late 13th century. In, e.g., The Zohar. Translated by Harry Sperling and Maurice Simon. 5 volumes. London: Soncino Press, 1934.
Bahya ben Asher. Commentary on the Torah. Spain, early 14th century. In, e.g., Midrash Rabbeinu Bachya: Torah Commentary by Rabbi Bachya ben Asher. Translated and annotated by Eliyahu Munk, volume 7, pages 2717–54. Jerusalem: Lambda Publishers, 2003. . 
Isaac ben Moses Arama. Akedat Yizhak (The Binding of Isaac). Late 15th century. In, e.g., Yitzchak Arama. Akeydat Yitzchak: Commentary of Rabbi Yitzchak Arama on the Torah. Translated and condensed by Eliyahu Munk, volume 2, pages 893–912. New York, Lambda Publishers, 2001. .

Modern
Isaac Abravanel. Commentary on the Torah. Italy, between 1492–1509. In, e.g., Abarbanel: Selected Commentaries on the Torah: Volume 5: Devarim/Deuteronomy. Translated and annotated by Israel Lazar, pages 152–77. Brooklyn: CreateSpace, 2015. .
Obadiah ben Jacob Sforno. Commentary on the Torah. Venice, 1567. In, e.g., Sforno: Commentary on the Torah. Translation and explanatory notes by Raphael Pelcovitz, pages 974–83. Brooklyn: Mesorah Publications, 1997. .

Moshe Alshich. Commentary on the Torah. Safed, circa 1593. In, e.g., Moshe Alshich. Midrash of Rabbi Moshe Alshich on the Torah. Translated and annotated by Eliyahu Munk, volume 3, pages 1112–21. New York, Lambda Publishers, 2000. .
Saul Levi Morteira. "Guarded Him as the Pupil of His Eye." Amsterdam, 1645. In Marc Saperstein. Exile in Amsterdam: Saul Levi Morteira's Sermons to a Congregation of "New Jews," pages 447–88. Cincinnati: Hebrew Union College Press, 2005. .

Thomas Hobbes. Leviathan, 3:36. England, 1651. Reprint edited by C. B. Macpherson, page 456. Harmondsworth, England: Penguin Classics, 1982. .

Chaim ibn Attar. Ohr ha-Chaim. Venice, 1742. In Chayim ben Attar. Or Hachayim: Commentary on the Torah. Translated by Eliyahu Munk, volume 5, pages 1968–81. Brooklyn: Lambda Publishers, 1999. .
Marbury v. Madison, 5 U.S. (1 Cranch) 137 (1803).

Samson Raphael Hirsch. Horeb: A Philosophy of Jewish Laws and Observances. Translated by Isidore Grunfeld, pages 20, 369–74, 385–91. London: Soncino Press, 1962. Reprinted 2002 . Originally published as Horeb, Versuche über Jissroel's Pflichten in der Zerstreuung. Germany, 1837.
Samuel David Luzzatto (Shadal). Commentary on the Torah. Padua, 1871. In, e.g., Samuel David Luzzatto. Torah Commentary. Translated and annotated by Eliyahu Munk, volume 4, pages 1262–66. New York: Lambda Publishers, 2012. .

Yehudah Aryeh Leib Alter. Sefat Emet. Góra Kalwaria (Ger), Poland, before 1906. Excerpted in The Language of Truth: The Torah Commentary of Sefat Emet. Translated and interpreted by Arthur Green, pages 329–32. Philadelphia: Jewish Publication Society, 1998. . Reprinted 2012. .
Hermann Cohen. Religion of Reason: Out of the Sources of Judaism. Translated with an introduction by Simon Kaplan; introductory essays by Leo Strauss, pages 81, 408. New York: Ungar, 1972. Reprinted Atlanta: Scholars Press, 1995. . Originally published as Religion der Vernunft aus den Quellen des Judentums. Leipzig: Gustav Fock, 1919.

Abraham Isaac Kook. The Lights of Penitence, 17:2. 1925. In Abraham Isaac Kook: the Lights of Penitence, the Moral Principles, Lights of Holiness, Essays, Letters, and Poems. Translated by Ben Zion Bokser, page 127. Mahwah, N.J.: Paulist Press 1978. .
Alexander Alan Steinbach. Sabbath Queen: Fifty-four Bible Talks to the Young Based on Each Portion of the Pentateuch, pages 161–64. New York: Behrman's Jewish Book House, 1936.

Joseph Reider. The Holy Scriptures: Deuteronomy with Commentary, pages 274–86. Philadelphia: Jewish Publication Society, 1937.
Martin Buber. On the Bible: Eighteen studies, pages 80–92. New York: Schocken Books, 1968.
F. Charles Fensham. "Salt as Curse in the Old Testament and the Ancient Near East." Biblical Archaeologist, volume 25 (number 2) (May 1962): pages 48–50.

Nehama Leibowitz. Studies in Devarim: Deuteronomy, pages 298–326. Jerusalem: The World Zionist Organization, 1980.
Carl Sagan. "Who Speaks for Earth?" Cosmos: A Personal Voyage, episode 13. Cosmos Studios, 1980.
Pinchas H. Peli. Torah Today: A Renewed Encounter with Scripture, pages 229–31. Washington, D.C.: B'nai B'rith Books, 1987. .
Patrick D. Miller. Deuteronomy, pages 199–216. Louisville: John Knox Press, 1990.
Lawrence H. Schiffman. "The New Halakhic Letter (4QMMT) and the Origins of the Dead Sea Sect." Biblical Archaeologist, volume 53 (number 2) (June 1990): pages 64–73.
Mark S. Smith. The Early History of God: Yahweh and the Other Deities in Ancient Israel, pages 85, 149. New York: HarperSanFrancisco, 1990. ..
Bernhard W. Anderson. "'Subdue the Earth': What Does It Mean? Humans received a God-given freedom to choose between a lifestyle that fosters life on this planet or that leads to death for the earth and its inhabitants. In the words of Deuteronomy 30:19: 'Choose life so that you and your descendants may live.'" Bible Review, volume 8 (number 5) (October 1992).
A Song of Power and the Power of Song: Essays on the Book of Deuteronomy. Edited by Duane L. Christensen. Winona Lake, Indiana: Eisenbrauns, 1993. .
Judith S. Antonelli. "Canaanites and the Covenant." In In the Image of God: A Feminist Commentary on the Torah, pages 482–88. Northvale, New Jersey: Jason Aronson, 1995. .
Ellen Frankel. The Five Books of Miriam: A Woman's Commentary on the Torah, pages 292–94. New York: G. P. Putnam's Sons, 1996. .

W. Gunther Plaut. The Haftarah Commentary, pages 500–09. New York: UAHC Press, 1996. .
Jeffrey H. Tigay. The JPS Torah Commentary: Deuteronomy: The Traditional Hebrew Text with the New JPS Translation, pages 277–88. Philadelphia: Jewish Publication Society, 1996. .
Sorel Goldberg Loeb and Barbara Binder Kadden. Teaching Torah: A Treasury of Insights and Activities, pages 335–39. Denver: A.R.E. Publishing, 1997. .

Susan Freeman. Teaching Jewish Virtues: Sacred Sources and Arts Activities, pages 8–25. Springfield, New Jersey: A.R.E. Publishing, 1999. ..
Adin Steinsaltz. Simple Words: Thinking About What Really Matters in Life, page 84. New York: Simon & Schuster, 1999. .
Miriam Carey Berkowitz. "Women and the Covenant." In The Women's Torah Commentary: New Insights from Women Rabbis on the 54 Weekly Torah Portions. Edited by Elyse Goldstein, pages 377–83. Woodstock, Vermont: Jewish Lights Publishing, 2000. .
Richard D. Nelson. "Deuteronomy." In The HarperCollins Bible Commentary. Edited by James L. Mays, pages 210–11. New York: HarperCollins Publishers, revised edition, 2000. .
Lainie Blum Cogan and Judy Weiss. Teaching Haftarah: Background, Insights, and Strategies, pages 348–54. Denver: A.R.E. Publishing, 2002. .
Michael Fishbane. The JPS Bible Commentary: Haftarot, pages 310–17. Philadelphia: Jewish Publication Society, 2002. .
Alan Lew. This Is Real and You Are Completely Unprepared: The Days of Awe as a Journey of Transformation, pages 65, 82–85, 152–54, 164. Boston: Little, Brown and Co., 2003. .
Joseph Telushkin. The Ten Commandments of Character: Essential Advice for Living an Honorable, Ethical, Honest Life, page 13. New York: Bell Tower, 2003. .
Robert Alter. The Five Books of Moses: A Translation with Commentary, pages 1022–30. New York: W.W. Norton & Co., 2004. .
Bernard M. Levinson. "Deuteronomy." In The Jewish Study Bible. Edited by Adele Berlin and Marc Zvi Brettler, pages 433–37. New York: Oxford University Press, 2004. .
Professors on the Parashah: Studies on the Weekly Torah Reading Edited by Leib Moscovitz, pages 345–48. Jerusalem: Urim Publications, 2005. .
Nathaniel Philbrick. Mayflower: A Story of Courage, Community, and War, page 292. New York: Viking Penguin, 2006. .
W. Gunther Plaut. The Torah: A Modern Commentary: Revised Edition. Revised edition edited by David E.S. Stern, pages 1372–85. New York: Union for Reform Judaism, 2006. .
Suzanne A. Brody. "The Covenant." In Dancing in the White Spaces: The Yearly Torah Cycle and More Poems, page 109. Shelbyville, Kentucky: Wasteland Press, 2007. .
James L. Kugel. How To Read the Bible: A Guide to Scripture, Then and Now, pages 347, 350–52, 354. New York: Free Press, 2007. .
The Torah: A Women's Commentary. Edited by Tamara Cohn Eskenazi and Andrea L. Weiss, pages 1217–34. New York: URJ Press, 2008. .
Eugene E. Carpenter. "Deuteronomy." In Zondervan Illustrated Bible Backgrounds Commentary. Edited by John H. Walton, volume 1, pages 512–13. Grand Rapids, Michigan: Zondervan, 2009. .
Sue Levi Elwell. "Embodied Jews: Parashat Nitzavim (Deuteronomy 29:9–30:20)." In Torah Queeries: Weekly Commentaries on the Hebrew Bible. Edited by Gregg Drinkwater, Joshua Lesser, and David Shneer; foreword by Judith Plaskow, pages 263–66. New York: New York University Press, 2009. .
Bruce Feiler. America's Prophet: Moses and the American Story. New York: William Morrow, 2009. . (on "choose life").
Reuven Hammer. Entering Torah: Prefaces to the Weekly Torah Portion, pages 293–98. New York: Gefen Publishing House, 2009. .

David Frankel. "Deuteronomy 29:21–28 in Historical and Textual Contexts." Hebrew Studies, volume 52 (2011): pages 137–70.
Shmuel Herzfeld. "Returning Together." In Fifty-Four Pick Up: Fifteen-Minute Inspirational Torah Lessons, pages 290–93. Jerusalem: Gefen Publishing House, 2012. .

Janice Weizman. "Beyond Belief: The notion of literature as a witness that cannot be denied testifies to the fact that generations of Jews have believed what is found there." The Jerusalem Report, volume 24 (number 11) (September 9, 2013): page 43.
Shlomo Riskin. Torah Lights: Devarim: Moses Bequeaths Legacy, History, and Covenant, pages 315–46. New Milford, Connecticut: Maggid Books, 2014. .
The Commentators' Bible: The Rubin JPS Miqra'ot Gedolot: Deuteronomy. Edited, translated, and annotated by Michael Carasik, pages 196–206. Philadelphia: Jewish Publication Society, 2015. .

Jonathan Sacks. Lessons in Leadership: A Weekly Reading of the Jewish Bible, pages 281–86. New Milford, Connecticut: Maggid Books, 2015. .
Jonathan Sacks. Essays on Ethics: A Weekly Reading of the Jewish Bible, pages 317–21. New Milford, Connecticut: Maggid Books, 2016. .
Kenneth Seeskin. Thinking about the Torah: A Philosopher Reads the Bible, pages 171–76. Philadelphia: The Jewish Publication Society, 2016. .
Shai Held. The Heart of Torah, Volume 2: Essays on the Weekly Torah Portion: Leviticus, Numbers, and Deuteronomy, pages 270–79. Philadelphia: Jewish Publication Society, 2017. .
Steven Levy and Sarah Levy. The JPS Rashi Discussion Torah Commentary, pages 174–76. Philadelphia: Jewish Publication Society, 2017. .
Ernst Wendland. Deuteronomy: translationNotes. Orlando, Florida: unfoldingWord, 2017.
Jonathan Sacks. Covenant & Conversation: A Weekly Reading of the Jewish Bible: Deuteronomy: Renewal of the Sinai Covenant, pages 253–87. New Milford, Connecticut: Maggid Books, 2019.

External links

Texts
Masoretic text and 1917 JPS translation
Hear the parashah chanted 
Hear the parashah read in Hebrew

Commentaries

Academy for Jewish Religion, New York
Aish.com
Akhlah: The Jewish Children's Learning Network
Aleph Beta Academy
American Jewish University — Ziegler School of Rabbinic Studies
Anshe Emes Synagogue, Los Angeles 
Ari Goldwag
Ascent of Safed
Bar-Ilan University
Chabad.org
eparsha.com
G-dcast
The Israel Koschitzky Virtual Beit Midrash
Jewish Agency for Israel
Jewish Theological Seminary
Kabbala Online
Mechon Hadar
MyJewishLearning.com
Ohr Sameach
ON Scripture — The Torah
Orthodox Union
OzTorah, Torah from Australia
Oz Ve Shalom — Netivot Shalom
Pardes from Jerusalem
Professor James L. Kugel
Professor Michael Carasik
Rabbi Dov Linzer
Rabbi Fabian Werbin
Rabbi Jonathan Sacks
RabbiShimon.com
Rabbi Shlomo Riskin
Rabbi Shmuel Herzfeld
Rabbi Stan Levin
Reconstructionist Judaism 
Sephardic Institute
Shiur.com
613.org Jewish Torah Audio
Tanach Study Center
Teach613.org, Torah Education at Cherry Hill
https://www.thetorah.com/parashah/nitzavim/ TheTorah.com]
Torah from Dixie
Torah.org
TorahVort.com
Union for Reform Judaism
United Synagogue of Conservative Judaism
What's Bothering Rashi?
Yeshivat Chovevei Torah
Yeshiva University

Weekly Torah readings in Elul
Weekly Torah readings from Deuteronomy